Junzi imperialis is an extinct species of gibbon that was found in an Ancient Chinese noblewoman's tomb. The type species, based on an incomplete skull, was named Junzi imperialis in 2018 by Samuel Turvey and colleagues. It is believed that when alive, around 2,200 to 2,300 years ago, the type specimen was owned by Lady Xia, the mother of King Zhuangxiang of Qin and grandmother of Qin Shi Huang, the first emperor of China.

Discovery and naming
The holotype skull was discovered when the tomb was opened in 2004. The living animal is thought to have been a member of Lady Xia's menagerie of luxury pets, which also included cranes, leopards, lynxes and a black bear.

The generic name was coined by Turvey and his colleagues in reference to how gibbons were, in ancient China, kept by noblemen scholars, or junzi (君子), as pets.

References

Gibbons
Holocene extinctions
Extinct animals of China
Extinct mammals of Asia
†